Group A of the 2010 Fed Cup Americas Zone Group II was one of two pools in the Americas Zone Group II of the 2010 Fed Cup. Five teams competed in a round robin competition, with the teams proceeding to their respective sections of the play-offs: the top two teams played for advancement to the 2011 Group I.

Bahamas vs. Ecuador

Dominican Republic vs. Costa Rica

Bahamas vs. Trinidad and Tobago

Ecuador vs. Costa Rica

Bahamas vs. Costa Rica

Dominican Republic vs. Trinidad and Tobago

Dominican Republic vs. Ecuador

Trinidad and Tobago vs. Costa Rica

Bahamas vs. Dominican Republic

Trinidad and Tobago vs. Ecuador

See also
Fed Cup structure

References

External links
 Fed Cup website

2010 Fed Cup Americas Zone